Wangia is an extinct genus of prehistoric bony fish that lived during the middle division of the Eocene epoch.

References

Prehistoric perciform genera
Eocene fish of Asia